Kahnu Shotori (also Romanized as Kahnū Shotorī; also known as Kahnūj-e Shotorī) is a village in Berentin Rural District, Bikah District, Rudan County, Hormozgan Province, Iran. At the 2006 census, its population was 272, in 54 families.

References 

Populated places in Rudan County